Bronisław Maria Komorowski (born 4 June 1952) is a Polish politician and historian who served as President of Poland from 2010 to 2015.

Komorowski served as Minister of Defence from 2000 to 2001. As Marshal of the Sejm, Komorowski exercised the powers and duties of head of state following the death of President Lech Kaczyński in a plane crash on 10 April 2010. Komorowski was then the governing Civic Platform party's candidate in the resulting presidential election, which he won in the second round of voting on 4 July 2010. He was sworn in as President on 6 August 2010. Komorowski thus became the second person to serve on two occasions as Polish head of state since 1918, after Maciej Rataj. 
On 25 May 2015, Komorowski conceded the presidency of Poland to the rival candidate Andrzej Duda, after the latter won the second round of the 2015 presidential election.

Early life and education
Bronisław Maria Komorowski was born in Oborniki Śląskie. Born as a son of Zygmunt Leon Komorowski (1925–1992), professor of African Studies at the University of Warsaw and Jadwiga Komorowska (née Szalkowska) .

From 1957 to 1959 he lived in Józefów near Otwock. From 1959 to 1966 he also attended elementary school in Pruszków. In 1966 he transferred to Warsaw and graduated from Cyprian Kamil Norwid High School no. 24. For many years he was affiliated with the Scout Movement. During his studies he was a Scout instructor in 208 WDHiZ "Parasol" Battalion in Mokotów. He met his future wife through Scouting.

In 1977 he finished his studies in history at the University of Warsaw. From 1977 to 1980 he was an editor at the journal Słowo Powszechne.

Dissident activity
In the Polish People's Republic, Komorowski took part in the democratic movement as an underground publisher and co-operated with Antoni Macierewicz on the monthly Głos (1977–1981). 

In 1980, he was sentenced along with activists of the Movement for Defense of Human and Civic Rights to one month in prison for organizing a demonstration on 11 November 1979 (the judge who presided the trial was Andrzej Kryże). 

From 1980 to 1981, he worked in the Centre of Social Investigation of NSZZ "Solidarity". On 27 September 1981, he was one of the signatories of the founding declaration of the Clubs in the Service of Independence. He was interned while Poland was under martial law. From 1981 to 1989, he taught at the Lower Seminary in Niepokalanów.

Third Republic

From 1989 to 1990, he was the manager minister Aleksander Hall's office, and from 1990 to 1993, the civil vice minister of national defence in the governments of Tadeusz Mazowiecki, Jan Krzysztof Bielecki and Hanna Suchocka. In the early 1990s he was involved with the Democratic Union and Freedom Union. From 1993 to 1995, he was the general secretary of these parties.

As a candidate of the Democratic Union he was elected to parliament in 1991 and in 1993. In 1997, during the 2nd Sejm, together with a group of Warsaw University activists under the management of Jan Rokita he created Koło Konserwatywno-Ludowe. In the same year Koło Konserwatywno-Ludowe joined the newly created Conservative People's Party (SKL), which joined Solidarity Electoral Action (AWS). 

In September 1997 Komorowski was elected as a candidate of AWS. From 1997 to 2000 he presided over the Parliamentary National Defence Committee, and from 2000 to 2001 served as the minister of national defence in the government of Jerzy Buzek. In 2001, while still a minister in the minority AWS government, Komorowski, along with some activists from SKL, became a member of Civic Platform (PO). He stood for election to the 4th Sejm as a candidate of PO. Again he was elected, this time for the Warsaw constituency. 

After the inauguration of the new parliament he resigned from SKL. Since 2001 he has been a member of the National Civic Platform Board. In the 4th Sejm he was the deputy chairman of the Parliamentary National Defence Committee and a member of the Parliamentary Committee on Foreign Affairs.

He won election to the 5th Sejm in a district outside Warsaw. On 26 October 2005, he was elected Vice Speaker of the Sejm. 398 MPs voted in favour of his candidacy. His party had earlier recommended him as a candidate for Speaker. His candidacy, in defiance of precedent, was rejected by Law and Justice (PiS) which voted for Marek Jurek. This created an unfavourable climate further discussions regarding a PO-PiS coalition.

After the resignation of Marek Jurek as Speaker of the Sejm on 25 April 2007 Civic Platform announced Komorowski's candidacy for Speaker. On 27 April 2007 the Sejm rejected his nomination, and Ludwik Dorn from PiS became a new marshal. 189 MPs voted for Komorowski. Komorowski became Deputy Marshal.

Komorowski took first place on the PO list for the Warsaw constituency in the 2007 parliamentary election and received 139,320 votes.

Marshal of the Sejm
On 5 November 2007, in the first session of the 4th Sejm of the Polish Republic Bronisław Komorowski was elected Speaker by 292 votes. He stood against Krzysztof Putra from PiS who received 160 votes. Stefan Niesiołowski, Krzysztof Putra, Jarosław Kalinowski, Jerzy Szmajdziński were elected Vice Speakers.

On 27 March 2010, he was chosen by PO members to be their candidate in 2010 presidential election.

President of Poland

Acting President

Komorowski became acting president on 10 April 2010 following the death of President Lech Kaczyński. His first decision was to announce seven days of national mourning beginning on 10 April. 

According to the Constitution of Poland, Komorowski was required to set a date for the next presidential election within 14 days of assuming the position, the election date coming within 60 days of that announcement. On 21 April, his office announced that the election would be held on 20 June. 

In the election, he got 41.54% of votes in the first round and then faced Jarosław Kaczyński, who got 36.46% of votes in the first round. In the runoff Komorowski was elected president (8 933 887 valid votes, 53,01%) and formally took office on 6 August 2010.

Presidency

Following the death of Władysław Stasiak, the chief of the Chancellery of the President of the Republic of Poland, Komorowski appointed Jacek Michałowski to succeed him on an acting basis. A high number of vacancies following the Smolensk crash necessitated numerous other appointments. On 12 April, he appointed retired General Stanisław Koziej head of the National Security Bureau in place of the late Aleksander Szczygło.

On 29 April 2010, Komorowski signed into law a parliamentary act that reformed the Institute of National Remembrance.

On 27 May 2010, Komorowski nominated Marek Belka, former Finance Minister and Prime Minister (2004–2005) of a then-leftist government, to be the president of the National Bank of Poland in place of the late Sławomir Skrzypek.

Following his election, Komorowski announced that he would resign from the Sejm on 8 July 2010, and thus cease to be a marshal and an acting president (his successor as an acting president was the next marshal of the Sejm Grzegorz Schetyna, who held the position for about a month before Komorowski's formal inauguration). Komorowski currently resides and works in the Belweder Palace instead of the Presidential Palace.

On 25 May 2015, following his defeat in the second round of the 2015 presidential election, Komorowski conceded the presidency to rival Andrzej Duda, after the latter won a 51.5% majority. His term ended on 6 August 2015, when Duda was sworn in as a new president.

Attitude towards Ukraine 
On February 22, 2015, he supported the idea of the President of Ukraine Petro Poroshenko to introduce a UN peacekeeping mission in Donbass.

On April 9, during a visit to Kyiv, he spoke from the rostrum of the Verkhovna Rada of Ukraine. During his speech, he stated: "There will be no stable, secure Europe if Ukraine does not become part of it, and only the blind can not see the presence of Russian troops in the Donbas." Politicians in Ukraine and Poland called the speech historic.

On July 2, he visited Lviv, where he received an honorary doctorate from Lviv University. During a joint press conference with Poroshenko, he stated that he would create his own institute to deal with Ukrainian-Polish relations.

Personal life
Komorowski has been married to Anna Dembowska since 1977. The couple has five children: Zofia Aleksandra (born 1979), Tadeusz Jan (born 1981), Maria Anna (born 1983), Piotr Zygmunt (born 1986) and Elżbieta Jadwiga (born 1989).

Honours and awards

National Honours 
 : 
 Knight of the Order of the White Eagle (ex officio)
 Grand Cross of the Order of Polonia Restituta (ex officio)

Foreign Honours 
: Recipient of the Grand Order of King Tomislav (8 May 2013)
: Collar of the Order of the Cross of Terra Mariana (14 March 2014)
: Grand Cross of the National Order of the Legion of Honour (16 November 2012)
: Grand Cross of the Order of the Redeemer (8 July 2013)
: Knight Grand Cross with Collar of the Order of Merit of the Italian Republic (10 June 2012)
: Commander Grand Cross with Chain of the Order of the Three Stars (23 November 2012)
: Honorary Companion of Honour of the National Order of Merit (2009)
: Knight Grand Officer of the Order of Saint Charles (October 2012)
: Knight Grand Cross of the Order of the Netherlands Lion (24 June 2014)
: Recipient of the Order 8-September (September 2013)
: Grand Cross of the Order of St. Olav (9 May 2012)
: Grand Collar of the Order of Prince Henry (19 April 2012)
: Grand Cross of the Order of the White Double Cross (20 May 2014)
: Knight of the Royal Order of the Seraphim (4 May 2011)
: Member 1st Class of the Order of Prince Yaroslav the Wise (2008)

Distinctions
: 
 Doctor honoris causa of the Mykolas Romeris University in Vilnius, Lithuania (14 January 2008)
 Doctor honoris causa of the Vytautas Magnus University in Kaunas, Lithuania (June 2015)

State visits gallery

Footnotes

External links

The only Official Biography of Bronisław Komorowski(in English)
The official website of the President of the Republic of Poland
Polish Lower House (in English – Polish version)
Civic Platform 
Wprost 24 

|-

|-

|-

1952 births
Civic Platform politicians
Bronislaw
Living people
Marshals of the Sejm of the Third Polish Republic
Deputy Marshals of the Sejm of the Third Polish Republic
Members of the Polish Sejm 1991–1993
Members of the Polish Sejm 1993–1997
Members of the Polish Sejm 1997–2001
Members of the Polish Sejm 2001–2005
Members of the Polish Sejm 2005–2007
Ministers of National Defence of Poland
People from Oborniki Śląskie
20th-century Polish historians
Polish male non-fiction writers
20th-century Polish nobility
Presidents of Poland
University of Warsaw alumni

Grand Collars of the Order of Prince Henry
Grand Croix of the Légion d'honneur
Grand Crosses of the Order of Polonia Restituta
Grand Officers of the Order of Saint-Charles
Knights Grand Cross with Collar of the Order of Merit of the Italian Republic
Recipients of the Order of Prince Yaroslav the Wise, 5th class
Recipients of the National Order of Merit (Malta)
Candidates in the 2010 Polish presidential election
Candidates in the 2015 Polish presidential election
Members of the Polish Sejm 2007–2011
Recipients of the Collar of the Order of the Cross of Terra Mariana
Recipients of the Order of the White Eagle (Poland)
Recipients of the Order of Prince Yaroslav the Wise, 1st class
Academic staff of Collegium Civitas